The Waitangi River is one of two so named in the Northland Region of New Zealand's North Island. It flows south then east from its origins in hills north of Whangarei, reaching the east coast at Ngunguru Bay, five kilometres south of Ngunguru.

See also
List of rivers of New Zealand

References

Rivers of the Northland Region
Rivers of New Zealand